The 1923–24 Divizia A was the twelfth season of Divizia A, the top-level football league of Romania.

Participating teams

Final Tournament of Regions

Preliminary round

Quarter-finals

1 Brașovia failed to appear, so it lost the game 0–3 by administrative decision.

Semifinals

Final
Arad, August 17, 1924

References

Liga I seasons
Romania
1923–24 in Romanian football